Amy Potomak (born June 25, 1999) is a Canadian-born women's ice hockey player that was named to the Canada women's national ice hockey team roster  that shall be competing against the United States in a pair of contests on December 13 (in Plymouth, Michigan) and December 20 (in Sarnia, Ontario). The series against the US shall mark Potomak's debut with the national team.

Playing career
At the 2014 British Columbia Winter Games, Potomak emerged with the gold medal. At the 2014 Stoney Creek Jr. Showcase, she was the event's leading scorer. She was a member of Team BC's women's ice hockey team at the 2015 Canada Winter Games.< Team BC would finish the event in sixth place.

On November 24, 2016, it was announced that Potomak would affiliate with the West Hawks, a midget boys team from the BC Major Midget League Valley. She becomes the third female in league history to affiliate with a boys team, following Kaleigh Fratkin with the Vancouver North West Giants and Kimberly Newell with the Kootenay Ice.

Hockey Canada
Potomak was a member of the Canada women's national under-18 ice hockey team that captured a silver medal at the 2016 IIHF World Women's U18 Championship. Along with her sister Sarah Potomak, they are the first sister duo named to the roster of Canada's national women's ice hockey team. The two played together in a two-game series against the United States national women's ice hockey team in December 2016.

Personal
Her sister is Sarah Potomak and the two played together with Team British Columbia at the 2013 Canadian U18 nationals. Currently, Sarah Potomak is a competitor with the Minnesota Golden Gophers women's ice hockey program. Her brother, Brandon Potomak captured a gold medal in ice hockey at the 2011 Canada Winter Games.

Awards and honours
Most Valuable Player, 2015 National Women's Under-18 Championship
Most Valuable Player, 2016 National Women's Under-18 Championship

References

1999 births
Canadian women's ice hockey forwards
Ice hockey people from British Columbia
Living people